Ingeborg Mello de Preiss (January 4, 1919 – October 25, 2009) was a track and field athlete from Argentina who competed mainly in the discus throw and the shot put. She represented Argentina at the 1948 and 1952 Summer Olympic Games. She won the gold medal in the women's discus throw and the shot put event at the 1951 Pan American Games in Buenos Aires, Argentina.

Born in Berlin, Germany, she was Jewish. She trained in San Lorenzo de Almagro Club in Buenos Aires.

References

1919 births
2009 deaths
Athletes from Berlin
German emigrants to Argentina
Argentine female shot putters
Argentine female discus throwers
Athletes (track and field) at the 1948 Summer Olympics
Athletes (track and field) at the 1951 Pan American Games
Athletes (track and field) at the 1952 Summer Olympics
Jewish Argentine sportspeople
Jewish female athletes (track and field)
Argentine Jews
Olympic athletes of Argentina
Naturalized citizens of Argentina
Pan American Games gold medalists for Argentina
Pan American Games medalists in athletics (track and field)
Medalists at the 1951 Pan American Games